John Hancock (March 4, 1941 – October 12, 1992) was an American actor.

Born in Hazen, Arkansas, Hancock moved to Detroit, Michigan with his parents. Hancock went to Wayne State University in Detroit.  He was employed at Mid-Town Market to pay his way through college. Hancock is possibly best remembered for his role as "Scotty" in the ABC miniseries Roots: The Next Generations. His large size and distinctive bass voice allowed him to establish a niche playing authority figures, and he was often cast as a minister, judge or high-ranking military officer.

Hancock also made recurring appearances in several television shows during his career, including Knots Landing, Cheers, Family Ties, Diff'rent Strokes, Cop Rock, The Dukes of Hazzard, Star Trek: The Next Generation, Amen, Midnight Caller, Pacific Station, and L.A. Law. He was working with Susan Dey on the CBS sitcom Love & War as the bartender "Ike Johnson" in 1992, when he died of a heart attack at his home in Los Angeles. Hancock's character's death was subsequently written into the series and he was replaced by actor Charlie Robinson.

Hancock was interred in the Devotion section, at Forest Lawn, Hollywood Hills Cemetery in Los Angeles, California.

Filmography

References

External links
 

1941 births
1992 deaths
American male film actors
American male television actors
African-American male actors
Male actors from Arkansas
People from Hazen, Arkansas
20th-century American male actors
20th-century African-American people